Wolfram Bergerowski (14 March 1936 – 2 June 2009) was a German politician of the Free Democratic Party (FDP) and former member of the German Bundestag.

Life 
Wolfram Bergerowski joined the FDP in 1968 and was a member of the state executive of the party in Baden-Württemberg. From 1971 to 1980, he was a member of the Ludwigsburg district council and from 1976 to 1980 he was also a member of the Baden-Württemberg state parliament. He was elected to the state parliament via the second mandate in the Ludwigsburg constituency. From 1980 to 1983, he was then a member of the German Bundestag via the State List of Baden-Württemberg. In the Bundestag he was a member of the Committee on Legal Affairs, the Committee on Petitions and the Committee on Internal German Relations.

Literature

References

1936 births
2009 deaths
Members of the Bundestag for Baden-Württemberg
Members of the Bundestag 1980–1983
Members of the Bundestag for the Free Democratic Party (Germany)
Members of the Landtag of Baden-Württemberg